Devil's Pocket is a small neighborhood in the South Philadelphia section of Philadelphia, Pennsylvania. The neighborhood, bordered by Christian and Taney streets, Grays Ferry Avenue, and the Naval Square development (the former U.S. Naval Asylum), consists of rowhouses tucked near an industrial landscape near the Schuylkill River. A historically Irish-American neighborhood, Devil’s Pocket has seen real estate development and gentrification in recent years, including a major expansion of the Children’s Hospital of Philadelphia.

According to one legend, Devil's Pocket got its name after a priest said the local youth were rough enough to steal from the devil’s pocket.

The 1983 novel God's Pocket by Pete Dexter and its later 2014 film adaptation are set in the fictional South Philadelphia neighborhood of God's Pocket, which is based on the tough reputation of Devil's Pocket.

References

Neighborhoods in Philadelphia
Irish-American neighborhoods
Southwest Center City, Philadelphia